Slingsby Bethell  (1695–1758) of Tower Hill, London was an English Member of Parliament and Lord Mayor of London.

He was the third son of William Bethell of Swinden, Yorkshire and the younger brother of Hugh Bethell. In his early life he bought a plantation in Antigua and returned to work in London as a well-to-do merchant involved in the Africa trade.

He was a member of the Fishmongers’ Company from 1749 to his death, an alderman of London in 1749, Sheriff of the City of London for 1751–52, and Lord Mayor of London for 1755–56. He was Member of Parliament for the City of London from 1747 to  November 1758.

He died unmarried in 1758.

References

1695 births
1758 deaths
People from Craven District
English merchants
Members of the Parliament of Great Britain for English constituencies
British MPs 1747–1754
British MPs 1754–1761
Sheriffs of the City of London
18th-century lord mayors of London
1750s in London